Liziba is a monorail station on Line 2 of Chongqing Rail Transit in Chongqing municipality, China. It is located in Yuzhong District. It opened in 2005.

The station is located on the sixth to eighth floor of a 19-story residential building. It uses specialized noise reduction equipment to isolate station noise from the surrounding residences.

Contrary to some misreporting, the station and building were constructed together as one whole structure. The monorail was not retrofitted through the middle of an existing structure.

Station structure

References

External links

Yuzhong District
Railway stations in Chongqing
Railway stations in China opened in 2005
Chongqing Rail Transit stations